Sången skall klinga or Sången ska klinga is a song written by Lasse Holm, and originally recorded by Wizex, with Kikki Danielsson on lead vocals for the 1979 album Some Girls & Trouble Boys.

The song also became a major Svensktoppen hit, staying at the chart for 10 weeks during the period 3 February-6 April 1980, and after two second-places it topped the chart from the third week. In 2008 the song became available on the Kikki Danielsson compilation album Kikkis bästa.

The song depicts a woman who feels new-born when meeting someone new and following her.

In 1980 the song was recorded by Ekelunds on the album Dansglädje 2, and in 1983 Thorleifs recorded it for the album Saxgodingar 2.

The song is also in Norwegian, with lyrics by Geir Hamnes as "Sangen skal klinge". With those lyrics, it was recorded by Bente Lind in 1981.

References

1979 songs
Songs written by Lasse Holm
Swedish songs
Swedish-language songs
Wizex songs